Bu ol Fath (also Romanized as Bū ol Fatḩ; also known as Abolfatḩ, Abū ol Fatḩ, Boolfat-h, and Būl Fath) is a village in Liravi-ye Jonubi Rural District, Imam Hassan District, Deylam County, Bushehr Province, Iran. At the 2006 census, its population was 118, in 29 families.

References 

Populated places in Deylam County